Daniel C. Taylor (born June 26, 1945) is an American scholar and practitioner of social change, with notable achievements in community-led conservation and global education. He also recognized as giving a definitive explanation for the century-old Yeti (or Abominable Snowman) mysteries.

In the words of Wade Davis, Taylor's method was shown around Mount Everest in “the creation of a nature preserve, not administered by distant bureaucrats but protected by the people who dwelt within its boundaries. It was a bold idea, so novel that at every meeting Daniel was able to increase the size”  until trans-border protection resulted for the entire Mount Everest and central Himalayan region.

Taylor is President of Future Generations University  which he founded. He has established twelve nonprofit organizations, ten still thrive, five are in the US. From 1993 to 2002, he was also a Senior Associate at Johns Hopkins Bloomberg School of Public Health.

He was knighted Suprabala-Gorkha-Dakshina-Bahu in Nepal in 1990, made the first Honorary Professor of Quantitative Ecology by the Chinese Academy of Sciences in 1995, and decorated with the Order of the Golden Ark by Prince Bernhard of the Netherlands in 2004.

Professional significance

Bill McKibben encapsulates his work, “The most interesting development expert I’ve ever met is a West Virginian named Daniel Taylor …. His mantra, based on a series of principles called SEED-SCALE, goes like this: Forget big plans. Development is not a product, not a target, not some happy future state … it’s a process, measured not in budgets but in how we invest our human energy.” 

His theoretical work on social change, SEED-SCALE, mentioned above by McKibben, was launched by then UNICEF Executive Director James P. Grant, resulted in a first major publication in 1995, a second in 2002, a third in 2012.), and a fourth in 2016  The basic concept is that ‘seeds’ of human success exist in every community, even those considered destitute, and from these seeds fitted to local culture, resources, and ecology can be ‘scaled up’ grown both a rising quality of life and also extension out toward equitable improvement for all.

In education, Taylor explored experiential education during his twenty years leading The Mountain Institute. With Future Generations University an accredited master's degree was started now extending to 40 countries.

In conservation, Taylor pioneered a method for community-based conservation that protects areas first by using political boundaries then within these environmental criteria to create management zones, a less costly, less confrontational approach within the World Network of Biosphere Reserves. In the US, his efforts integrated private land with public lands near Spruce Knob the summit of West Virginia. With the Green Long March in China, an environmental educational consortium was created with 50 Chinese universities.

In the Himalaya, his conservation initiatives include trans-border conservation between China and Nepal with a seven million acre initiative around Mount Everest in Nepal the (Makalu-Barun National Park and adjoining in Tibet/China Qomolangma national nature preserve. In eastern Tibet Autonomous Region, he and co-worker Chun-Wuei Su Chien led in establishing the Lalu Wetlands National Nature Preserve in Lhasa, at 1,600 acres, now a region completely surrounded by the city of Lhasa. Additionally, he led in setting up a range of community conservation initiatives in Arunachal Pradesh, India.

For the enigmatic maker of mysterious tracks in Himalayan snows, the yeti, after three decades of field research he was able to show ‘the abominable snowman’ to be the Asiatic black bear (Ursus thibetanus) which in its early life years spends time in trees and develops a “thumb-like” digit on its paw that then can make an overprint of hind paw onto front creating a human-looking, bipedal-like snowprint.

In 2016, Taylor published an analysis of all Yeti literature, giving added evidence to the (Ursusthibetanus) explanation of Yeti legends. Importantly, this book from Oxford University gave a meticulous explanation for the iconic Yeti footprint photographed by Eric Shipton in 1950. To complete this explanation, Taylor also located a never-before published photograph of that print that included bear nailmarks.

Additionally, Taylor has an interest in building innovative physical structures—a diversity of structures modifying the Mongolian yurt, two homebuilt airplanes (Varieze and Defiant), super-insulated homes and offices, electrical wind generators, and restoration of historic structures from an 1845 gristmill in West Virginia to three monasteries in Tibet.

Organizations founded

 1972, co-founded The Woodlands Institute (experiential education) that evolved into The Mountain Institute (mountain people and environments)
 1980, co-founded Pendleton Community Care (comprehensive U.S. rural primary health care)
 1989, founded the Tibetan KyiApso Club (to introduce an unusual large shaggy dog from the Tibetan Plateau). This organization has subsequently closed.
 1992–2012, launched the Future Generations family of nine autonomous but mutually supportive organizations worldwide whose shared purpose is to research, demonstrate, and teach how to mobilize social change. Future Generations USA/China/Arunachal/India/Peru/Afghanistan/Canada/Haiti/Graduate School
 2011, launched the University of the World, a to be accredited global university This organization has subsequently closed.
 2016, launched Experience Learning, an experiential education organization in Pendleton County with two campuses <ref>[experience-learning.org]

Books published

 "Yeti: The Ecology of a Mystery" (New Delhi: Oxford University Press, 2017)
 “Just and Lasting Change: When Communities Own Their Futures, 2nd Edition” (Baltimore MD: Johns Hopkins University Press, 2016)
 “Mount Everest Guide to Off-road Driving”, (Franklin, WV: Forwards Press, 2014)
 Empowerment on an Unstable Planet: From Seeds of Human Energy to a Scale of Global Change, co-authors Carl E. Taylor, Jesse O. Taylor, (New York: Oxford University Press, 2012)
 CAIRNS: A Novel of Tibet, (For Words Press: Franklin, WV, 2011)
 Just and Lasting Change: When Communities Own Their Futures, Carl E. Taylor co-author, (Baltimore: Johns Hopkins University Press, 2002)
 Community Based Sustainable Human Development—Going to Scale with Self-reliant Social Development, co-author Carl E. Taylor, (New York: UNICEF, 1995).
 Something Hidden Behind the Ranges: An Himalayan Quest, (San Francisco: Mercury House, 1995)
 Population Education for Nepal, co-author Hem Hamal (Chapel Hill, NC: Carolina Population Center, University of North Carolina Press, 1973).

References

External links
 Future Generations
 Future Generations University
 Official Website - Daniel C. Taylor

1945 births
Living people
American conservationists
Order of Gorkha Dakshina Bahu
People from Pendleton County, West Virginia